Eunomia caymanensis is a moth of the subfamily Arctiinae. It was described by George Hampson in 1911. It is found on the Cayman Islands and Cuba.

References

 

Arctiinae
Moths described in 1911